{{safesubst:#invoke:RfD|||month = March
|day =  4
|year = 2023
|time = 19:52
|timestamp = 20230304195240

|content=
REDIRECT From Saigon to Dien Bien Phu

}}